The Tipits Lakes are two lakes that are located in the Tipits cirque of the Northern Pirin mountains of Bulgaria.

The upper lake has a surface area of 17,7 decares and is 2,3 m deep; while the Lower lake has a surface area of 15,9 decares and depth of 9 m. There is also a smaller lake which drys up. The two bigger lakes are not connected and their water pours out from separate streams. There is trout in the lakes.

References 

Lakes of the Pirin